Margaret Ann (“Peg”) Shelley Vance (30 July 1925 - 18 May 2008) was an American composer and music educator who is best remembered today for her compositions and arrangements for choirs.

Vance was born in Lincoln, Nebraska, to Dora Aldona Kidd and Harold E. Shelley. She married Robert Wesley Vance in 1957 and they had two sons, Robert and Miles. Vance earned degrees from the University of Nebraska and Columbia University Teachers College. She taught music at Chico State College and the University of Portland, where she chaired the Fine Arts Department and served as the interim Dean of Education.

Vance published several collections and series of music for choirs:

Music for Advancing Choirs
Music for Young Choirs
Sacred Music for Treble Voices (with Lee Kjelson)
Secular Music for Treble Voices (with Lee Kjelson)

Vance's music was published by Belwin (Belwin Mills) and G. Schirmer Inc. Her works  for choir include:

Angelico (Haitian folk song arranged by Vance)
Billy Boy
Blow the Wind Southerly (English folk song arranged by Vance)
Bring a Torch, Jeannette Isabella
Christmas Folk Song (text by Lizette Woodworth Reese)
Halleluia Amen
(The) Holly and the Ivy
Horo Mhairidu Turn Ye to Me (text by John Wilson; Scottish melody arranged by Vance)
Hymn to the Night (text by Henry Wadsworth Longfellow)
I Heard the Bells on Christmas Day (text by Henry Wadsworth Longfellow; music by Johnny Marks; arranged by Lee Kjelson and Vance)
I Ride an Old Paint
I Will Give Thanks
Loch Lomond
Love the Lord
March of the Kings - French folk song
Night Before Christmas (text by Clement Clarke Moore; music by Johnny Marks; arranged by Lee Kjelson and Vance)
Pretty Saro (Appalachian folk song arranged by Vance)
Reuben and Rachel
Ring Around the World (text by Annette Wynne)

References 

American women composers
Choral composers
1925 births
2008 deaths
People from Lincoln, Nebraska
University of Nebraska alumni
Teachers College, Columbia University alumni
California State University faculty
University of Portland faculty